Book of Thugs: Chapter A.K., Verse 47 is the third studio album by American rapper Trick Daddy. It was released on February 15, 2000 via Slip-N-Slide/Atlantic Records. Recording sessions took place at 4 Star Recording Studio. Production was handled by Righteous Funk Boogie, Black Mob Group, DJ Spin, and The Committee, with Ted Lucas serving as executive producer. It features guest appearances from the Lost Tribe, Money Mark Diggla, Buddy Roe, JoVaughn "J.V." Clark, C.O., Duece Poppito, Izm, Mystikal, Society, Trina and Twista. The album peaked at number 26 on the Billboard 200 and number 8 on the Top R&B/Hip-Hop Albums chart. It was certified Gold by the Recording Industry Association of America on May 10, 2000 for sales of over 500,000 copies in the United States. Its lead single, "Shut Up", reached #83 on the Billboard Hot 100.

Track listing

Personnel
 Righteous Funk Boogie – recording, engineering
 JoVaughn Clark – engineering
 Ray Seay – mixing
 Ted Lucas – executive producer
 Solomon Hepburn – co-executive producer
 Thomas Bricker – art direction
 Alan Lewis – creative direction
 Al Freddy – photography
 Lawrence Marano – photography
 Society – cover concept
 Mike Caren – A&R
 Robert Alexander – A&R

Charts

Weekly charts

Year-end charts

Certifications

References

External links

2000 albums
Trick Daddy albums
Atlantic Records albums